This is a list of German television related events from 1983.

Events
20 March - Hoffmann & Hoffmann are selected to represent Germany at the 1983 Eurovision Song Contest with their song "Rücksicht". They are selected to be the twenty-eighth German Eurovision entry during Ein Lied für München held at the BR Studios in Munich.
23 April - The 28th Eurovision Song Contest is held at the Rudi-Sedlmayer-Halle in Munich. Luxembourg wins the contest with the song "Si la vie est cadeau", performed by Corinne Hermès.

Debuts

ARD
 7 January – Kontakt bitte... (1983–1987)
 13 January – Es ist angerichtet  (1983)
 24 January – 6 Richtige (1983)
 2 March – Monaco Franze - Der ewige Stenz  (1983)
 5 April – Formel Eins (1983–1990)
 10 April – Abenteuer Bundesrepublik (1983)
 17 April – Schau ins Land (1983)
 25 April –  Selbst ist die Frau (1983)
 27 June – Engel auf Rädern  (1983)
 14 July – Köberle kommt  (1983)
 25 July – Vom Webstuhl zur Weltmacht (1983)
 19 October –  Landluft  (1983)
 23 October – Rote Erde (1983)
 31 December – Geschichten aus der Heimat (1983–1994)

ZDF
 21 May –  (1983)
 1 June – Wagen 106 (1983)
 22 June – Konsul Möllers Erben (1983)
 4 August – Der Paragraphenwirt (1983)
 1 September – Unsere schönsten Jahre (1983–1985)
 24 September – Gestern bei Müllers (1983)
 2 October – Bettkantengeschichten (1983–1990)
 3 November – Ich heirate eine Familie (1983–1986)
 20 December – Weißblaue Geschichten (1983–2016)
 24 December – Waldheimat (1983–1984)
 25 December –  
 Nesthäkchen (1983)
 Diese Drombuschs (1983–1994)
 27 December – Zelleriesalat  (1983)

DFF
 9 January – Märkische Chronik (1983–1989)
 20 September – Der Bastard (1983)
 9 October – Martin Luther (1983)
 28 October – Bühne frei (1983)
 31 December – Ferienheim Bergkristall  (1983–1989)

Television shows

1950s
Tagesschau (1952–present)

1960s
 heute (1963-present)

1970s
 heute-journal (1978-present)
 Tagesthemen (1978-present)

1980s
Wetten, dass..? (1981-2014)

Ending this year

Births

Deaths